XHOM-FM is a radio station on 107.5 FM in Coatzacoalcos, Veracruz, Mexico.

History
In 1961, Radio Coatzacoalcos, S.A., the owners of XEOM-AM 1340, became one of several dozen Mexican AM station owners to experiment with FM broadcasting. The early experiments, including XEOM-FM which received its concession on April 17, 1961, involved many stations broadcasting on even decimal frequencies; XEOM, at 88.4 MHz with an effective radiated power of 3.8 kW, is among the few left standing in any capacity. By 1969, Radio Coatzacoalcos, S.A. was owned by Francisco Ibarra López, founder of Grupo ACIR.

At the end of the 1960s, the abandonment of even decimal frequency FM stations, which were scarcely used in the Americas, meant the relocation of the remaining stations broadcasting in such a capacity. The result was that the station, now with a "correct" FM callsign of XHOM-FM and operating separately from its AM sister, moved to 107.5 MHz and increased its power to 23.115 kW. The station has since increased power once again, to 52 kW, and it also has seen three changes in concessionaire since the 1980s while maintaining ACIR ownership.

Effective June 28, 2022, Grupo ACIR opted to shut down XHOM-FM and XHNE-FM, taking XHOM-FM off the air after 61 years. The closure of the cluster caused the loss of 17 jobs. That same week, XHDQ-FM in San Andrés Tuxtla was closed.

On November 21 of the same year, XHOM and its sister station XHNE-FM 100.1 returned to the air under the Ke Buena grupera brand.

References

Radio stations in Veracruz
Radio stations established in 1961
Grupo ACIR